The Keiter Mound (designated 33-Cn-15) is a Native American mound in the southwestern part of the U.S. state of Ohio. Located north of the city of Wilmington, it sits on a wooded hill above the stream bottom of a small secondary creek, the Anderson Fork.

Due to its location, the Keiter Mound is believed to be a work of Hopewellian peoples.  Unlike many Hopewell sites, such as the Newark Earthworks or Mound City, the Keiter Mound is isolated: no other mounds and no large geometric earthworks are located nearby.  As such, it is likely to have been created by small groups of transient hunters who camped in the valley below.  This identification is based on the mound's location and comparison with similar mounds: as the mound has never been substantially excavated, it likely holds the same grave goods as it did when it was constructed thousands of years ago.  The top is flat and slightly scarred, possibly from an early excavation, but for all practical purposes the mound is in pristine condition.  For this reason, it is a significant archaeological site: it is an unusually well preserved example of isolate Hopewell construction and might be able to yield important information about the Hopewell way of life.  In recognition of its archaeological significance, the Keiter Mound was listed on the National Register of Historic Places in 1975.

References

Ohio Hopewell
Archaeological sites on the National Register of Historic Places in Ohio
National Register of Historic Places in Clinton County, Ohio
Mounds in Ohio